Johan Olofsson may refer to:

Johan Olofsson (ice hockey) (born 1994), Swedish ice hockey player
Johan Olofsson (snowboarder) (born 1976), Swedish snowboarder